Cameron "Cam" Baerg (born October 17, 1972 in Saskatoon, Saskatchewan) is a Canadian rower.

Rowing career
He began rowing in 1987. He won a gold medal at the men's four event at the 2003 World Championships in Milan, Italy and a silver at the same event at the 2004 Summer Olympics.

References

1972 births
Living people
Canadian male rowers
Canadian people of Norwegian descent
Olympic silver medalists for Canada
Olympic rowers of Canada
Rowers at the 2004 Summer Olympics
Sportspeople from Saskatoon
Olympic medalists in rowing
Medalists at the 2004 Summer Olympics
World Rowing Championships medalists for Canada
20th-century Canadian people
21st-century Canadian people